Randy "Jay" Jackson (born October 27, 1987) is an American professional baseball pitcher in the Toronto Blue Jays organization. Jackson played college baseball at Furman University. He was drafted by the Chicago Cubs in the ninth round of the 2008 Major League Baseball draft. He made his MLB debut in 2015. He previously played in MLB for the San Diego Padres, Milwaukee Brewers, San Francisco Giants and Atlanta Braves, and in Nippon Professional Baseball for the Hiroshima Toyo Carp and Chiba Lotte Marines.

Career

Chicago Cubs
Jackson attended Christ Church Episcopal School in Greenville, South Carolina, and Furman University. He was drafted by the Chicago Cubs in the ninth round, 281st overall, of the 2008 Major League Baseball draft. He made his professional debut with the Low-A Boise Hawks, and also played for the Single-A Peoria Chiefs and the High-A Daytona Cubs, posting a cumulative 2.88 ERA in 13 games. In 2009, Jackson split the year between Daytona, the Double-A Tennessee Smokies, and the Triple-A Iowa Cubs, pitching to an 8–7 record and 2.98 ERA in 24 games between the three teams. The following season, Jackson returned to Iowa and posted an 11–8 record and 4.63 ERA with 119 strikeouts in 157.1 innings of work. In 2011, Jackson again played with Iowa, registering an 8–14 record and 5.34 ERA in 26 appearances. In 2012, Jackson returned to Iowa for a fourth straight year, but struggled to a 3–7 record and 6.57 ERA in 37 appearances with the team. On April 4, 2013, Jackson was released by the Cubs organization.

Miami Marlins
On April 9, 2013, Jackson signed a minor league contract with the Miami Marlins organization. He split the year between the Double-A Jacksonville Suns and the Triple-A New Orleans Zephyrs, pitching to a 4–7 record and 3.53 ERA with 93 strikeouts in 104.2 innings pitched between the two teams. On November 4, he elected free agency.

Pittsburgh Pirates
On November 20, 2013, Jackson signed a minor league contract with the Pittsburgh Pirates organization that included an invitation to spring training. He began the 2014 season with the Triple-A Indianapolis Indians, logging a 5–4 record and 4.89 ERA in 25 appearances.

Milwaukee Brewers
On August 7, 2014, Jackson was traded to the Milwaukee Brewers in exchange for cash considerations. He finished the year with the Triple-A Nashville Sounds, recording a 5.06 ERA in 6 starts. On November 4, he elected free agency.

San Diego Padres
On January 26, 2015, Jackson signed a minor league contract with the San Diego Padres that included an invitation to spring training. He began the year with the Double-A San Antonio Missions before being promoted to the Triple-A El Paso Chihuahuas. On September 14, Jackson was selected to the 40-man roster and promoted to the major leagues for the first time. He made his MLB debut that day, pitching two-thirds of an inning against the Arizona Diamondbacks and allowing two earned runs. He finished the year with a 6.23 ERA in 6 major league games. Jackson was released by the Padres on December 26 so he could pursue an opportunity in Japan.

Hiroshima Toyo Carp
On December 26, 2015, Jackson signed with the Hiroshima Toyo Carp of Nippon Professional Baseball (NPB) for the 2016 season. Jackson made 67 appearances for Hiroshima in 2016, posting a 5–4 record and 1.71 ERA with 89 strikeouts in 68.1 innings of work. The following year, Jackson pitched to a 2.76 ERA in 48 appearances for the team. In 2018 with the Carp, Jackson recorded a 2.76 ERA with 48 strikeouts in 45.2 innings pitched.

Milwaukee Brewers (second stint)
On February 15, 2019, Jackson signed a minor league deal with the Milwaukee Brewers organization that included an invitation to spring training. He was assigned to the Triple-A San Antonio Missions to begin the year. Jackson had his contract selected to the major leagues on April 29, 2019. Jackson allowed 5 runs in 2.1 innings before being designated for assignment on May 5 following the promotion of Burch Smith. He was outrighted to San Antonio on May 8. With San Antonio, he was selected in the Triple-A All-Star team. The Brewers selected Jackson's contract back to the active roster on July 13. Jackson finished the year with a stellar 1.33 ERA in 34 appearances with San Antonio, and a 4.45 ERA in 28 games with Milwaukee. He became a free agent after the season.

Chiba Lotte Marines
On December 4, 2019, Jackson signed with the Chiba Lotte Marines of Nippon Professional Baseball (NPB). In 7 games for Lotte in 2020, Jackson registered a 3.86 ERA with 12 strikeouts in 7.0 innings. On July 10, 2020, Jackson was arrested on suspicion of cannabis possession and was released by the Marines the same day.

Cincinnati Reds 
On August 28, 2020, the Cincinnati Reds signed Jackson to a minor league contract and added him to their 60-man player pool. Jackson did not play in a game for the Reds organization due to the cancellation of the minor league season because of the COVID-19 pandemic. He became a free agent on November 2, 2020.

San Francisco Giants
On January 8, 2021, Jackson signed a minor league contract with the San Francisco Giants organization. He was assigned to the Triple-A Sacramento River Cats to begin the year, and pitched 11.0 scoreless innings with the team. On July 16, Jackson was selected to the Giants' active roster.

In the 2021 regular season with the Giants, Jackson was 2-1 with a 3.74 ERA. In 23 games (one start), he pitched 21.2 innings striking out 28 batters, and averaged 6.2 hits, 5.0 walks, and 11.2 strikeouts per 9 innings. On November 19, 2021, Jackson was designated for assignment by the Giants.

Atlanta Braves
On November 22, 2021, Jackson was traded to the Atlanta Braves in exchange for cash considerations, and a player to be named later or additional cash considerations. On March 18, 2022, Jackson was placed on the 60-day injured list with a lat strain.

On September 16, 2022, Jackson was designated for assignment. He elected free agency on November 6, 2022.

Toronto Blue Jays
On January 11, 2023, Jackson signed a minor league contract with the Toronto Blue Jays.

References

External links

Furman Paladins bio 

1987 births
Living people
African-American baseball players
American expatriate baseball players in Japan
American people convicted of drug offenses
Atlanta Braves players
Baseball players from South Carolina
Boise Hawks players
Chiba Lotte Marines players
Daytona Cubs players
El Paso Chihuahuas players
Furman Paladins baseball players
Hiroshima Toyo Carp players
Indianapolis Indians players
Iowa Cubs players
Jacksonville Suns players
Leones del Caracas players
American expatriate baseball players in Venezuela
Major League Baseball pitchers
Milwaukee Brewers players
Nashville Sounds players
New Orleans Zephyrs players
Nippon Professional Baseball pitchers
Peoria Chiefs players
San Antonio Missions players
San Diego Padres players
San Francisco Giants players
Sportspeople from Greenville, South Carolina
Tennessee Smokies players
Venados de Mazatlán players
Yaquis de Obregón players
American expatriate baseball players in Mexico
Florida Complex League Braves players